The Akron Formation is a geologic formation in New York. It preserves fossils dating back to the Silurian period. The Akron Formation is primarily a mottled dolomite. Type section is at Murder Creek, Akron Falls, Akron, New York.

See also

 List of fossiliferous stratigraphic units in New York

References

 
 Berdan, Jean M., 1972. Brachiopoda and Ostracoda of the Cobleskill Limestone (Upper Silurian) of Central New York, U.S. Geological Survey Professional Paper 730.

Silurian geology of New York (state)
Silurian southern paleotemperate deposits